Leiocephalus semilineatus, commonly known as the Hispaniolan pale-bellied curlytail, Thomazeau curlytail lizard, or pale-bellied Hispaniolan curlytail, is a species of lizard in the family Leiocephalidae (curly-tailed lizard). It is native to Hispaniola.

References

Leiocephalus
Reptiles described in 1920
Reptiles of Haiti
Reptiles of the Dominican Republic
Taxa named by Emmett Reid Dunn